The 1980-81 Fulham RLFC season was the first in the club's history. They entered into the 1980–81 Second Division of the Rugby Football League. They also competed in the 1980–81 Challenge Cup and the 1980–81 League Cup. They finished the season in 3rd place and were promoted to the top tier of professional rugby league in the UK.

Birth of Fulham RLFC
In 1980, Fulham Football Club chairman Ernie Clay, set up a rugby league team at Craven Cottage, with the intention of creating another income stream for the football club. Warrington director Harold Genders, who had helped to persuade Clay of the benefits of starting a rugby league club in the capital, resigned from the Warrington board to become managing director of Fulham R.L.F.C. The Rugby Football League (RFL), keen to encourage the expansion of the sport beyond its traditional Northern heartland, accepted the new club with 26 clubs voting in favour, with three abstentions at the League's AGM.

One of the game's leading players, Reg Bowden, was recruited by Genders to act as player-coach. He cost the club £25,000 at a time when the world record transfer fee was £40,000.

The club's first signing was Roy Lester on a free transfer from Warrington. Within nine weeks, Genders and Bowden had assembled a team of experienced players approaching retirement, together with a few promising youngsters.

Nearly 10,000 Londoners turned up for the opening game at Craven Cottage to see the newly formed side convincingly beat highly regarded Wigan 24–5. The new Fulham RL team quickly proved to be very competitive and went on to win promotion at the end of their inaugural season.

Second Division League Table

Players

Results

References

External links
Rugby League Project

London Broncos seasons
London Broncos season
Fulham RLFC season
Fulham RLFC season
London Broncos season
Fulham RLFC season
Fulham RLFC season